John William Oates (born April 7, 1948) is an American musician, best known as half of the rock and soul duo Hall & Oates, with Daryl Hall. He has played rock, R&B, and soul music, acting as a guitarist, singer, songwriter, and record producer.

Although Oates's main role in the duo is being the guitarist, he also co-wrote many of the top 10 songs that they recorded, including: "Sara Smile" (referring to Hall's then-girlfriend, Sara Allen), "She's Gone", and "Out of Touch", as well as "You Make My Dreams", "I Can't Go for That (No Can Do)", "Maneater", and "Adult Education". He also sang lead vocals on several more singles in the Hot 100, such as "How Does It Feel to Be Back", "You've Lost That Lovin' Feelin'" (a remake of the 1965 song performed by the Righteous Brothers), and "Possession Obsession". In 1986, Oates contributed the song "(She's the) Shape of Things to Come" on the soundtrack to the 1986 film About Last Night. He also co-wrote and sang backup on the song "Electric Blue", recorded by the Australian band Icehouse, which was a Billboard top 10 hit.

Oates was inducted into the Songwriters Hall of Fame in 2004, and in 2014 was inducted into the Rock and Roll Hall of Fame, as a member of Daryl Hall & John Oates. His memoir, Change of Seasons, was published in 2017.

Early life
Oates was born in New York City. His mother, Ann De Palma, was an Italian immigrant originally from Salerno. His father, Al Oates, was born to an English father and Gibraltarian mother, who claimed Moroccan heritage. He was raised in North Wales, Pennsylvania, a suburb of Philadelphia. 

Oates attended North Penn High School and was co-captain of the 1965-66 wrestling team his senior year and was Section 2 champion in the  weight class.  Oates turned down wrestling scholarships and opted to attend Temple University instead because "it was in the city." Oates wrestled as a freshman at Temple and then "got tired of losing weight."

Career
In 1966, he recorded his first single, "I Need Your Love," with the Masters for Philadelphia-based Crimson Records. After graduating from North Penn High School in 1966, John enrolled in Temple University in Philadelphia, where he met Daryl Hall, a senior at Temple who was also a professional musician. The two were involved in several college bands, then formed the duo Hall & Oates, and by 1972, they had signed with Atlantic Records. Hall & Oates went on to record 21 albums (to date), which have sold over 80 million units worldwide, making them arguably the most successful duo in pop–rock history. They have scored ten number-one records and over 20 Top 40 hits and have toured the world for decades. Their involvement in the original Live Aid concert and the charity single "We Are the World", both in 1985, established them further as artists. Their influence on modern American pop music and considerable contributions have been acknowledged by numerous contemporary bands, including Gym Class Heroes and the Killers.

In 1983, Oates was asked whether he regretted not pursuing his degree in journalism. He replied that he did not—and admitted that he had in fact never intended to finish it.

Despite 30 years as a chart-topping performer and sought-after producer, Oates did not release a solo album until 2002's Phunk Shui.

Oates took part, along with Jamie Cullum, in the song "Greatest Mistake" by Handsome Boy Modeling School. The song appears on the 2004 album White People.

Oates' second solo album, 1000 Miles of Life, was released on August 23, 2008.

As reported by Billboard in 2008, Oates was shopping an animated series titled J-Stache, created by Evan Duby at Primary Wave Music Publishing.

In March 2010, Oates played with the indie rock band the Bird and the Bee as a surprise guest. The show was a medley of the Bird and the Bee songs, as well as classic Hall & Oates. The performance was dedicated to H&O bassist T-Bone Wolk who died on February 27, 2010.

On October 1, 2011, Margo Rey charted at #24 on Billboard's Adult Contemporary Tracks with the song "Let the Rain", which was co-written by Oates.

On March 11, 2013, Oates released a new single, "Stand Strong", which he co-wrote with Teddy Morgan. "Stand Strong" is part of Good Road to Follow, a set of original songs released as digital singles, one after the other. In 2015, Oates released Another Good Road, a DVD and Live CD combination via PS Records / Warner Elektra, which also debuted as a television special on the Palladia music channel. The DVD was shot live in a recording studio in Nashville, Tennessee, and features rare footage of his home in Woody Creek, Colorado.

His memoir Change of Seasons was published on March 28, 2017 by St. Martin's Press.

He released an album with his new backing band, "The Good Road Band", titled "Arkansas" on February 2, 2018. Oates commented that the album serves as a connection back to his pre-Hall & Oates music interest of traditional delta, country blues, and ragtime.

Oates has used many instruments and effects throughout his musical career and endorses several manufacturers and brands. Some of the companies endorsed by Oates include, Taylor Guitars, Voyage Air Guitars, Neunaber Audio, LR Baggs, and Fishman.

Personal life
Oates has been married twice. His first wife was Nancy Hunter, a former model. He and his second wife Aimee Oates have a son, Tanner, who was born in 1996. They reside in Woody Creek, Colorado, as well as Nashville, Tennessee. Oates became friends with gonzo journalist Hunter S. Thompson when he moved to Woody Creek in the late 1980s and the pair maintained a close bond until Thompson's death in 2005.

Hall & Oates songs on which Oates sings lead 

 "All Our Love" (co-lead vocal) from Whole Oats
 "Southeast City Window" from Whole Oats
 "Thank You For ..." from Whole Oats
 "Lilly (Are You Happy)" (co-lead vocal) from Whole Oats
 "Had I Known You Better Then" from Abandoned Luncheonette
 "Las Vegas Turnaround (The Stewardess Song)" from Abandoned Luncheonette
 "She's Gone" (co-lead vocal) from Abandoned Luncheonette
 "I'm Just A Kid (Don't Make Me Feel Like A Man)" from Abandoned Luncheonette
 "Lady Rain" (co-lead vocal) from Abandoned Luncheonette
 "Can't Stop The Music (He Played It Much Too Long)" from War Babies
 "Is it a Star" (co-lead vocal) from War Babies
 "Johnny Gore and the "C" Eaters" (co-lead vocal) from War Babies
 "Past Times Behind" from "The Atlantic Collection" compilation
 "Camellia" from Daryl Hall & John Oates
 "Alone Too Long" from Daryl Hall & John Oates "Soldering" from "Daryl Hall & John Oates
 "Ice" from Daryl Hall & John Oates
 "Back Together Again" from Bigger Than Both of Us
 "Crazy Eyes" from Bigger Than Both of Us
 "You'll Never Learn" from Bigger Than Both of Us
 "The Emptyness" from Beauty on a Back Street
 "Love Hurts (Love Heals)" from Beauty on a Back Street
 "The Girl Who Used to Be" from Beauty on a Back Street
 "Melody for a Memory" from Along the Red Ledge
 "Serious Music" from Along the Red Ledge
 "Pleasure Beach" from Along the Red Ledge
 "Portable Radio" (co-lead vocal) from X-Static
 "All You Want Is Heaven" (co-lead vocal) from X-Static
 "Bebop/Drop" from X-Static
 "How Does It Feel To Be Back" from Voices
 "Hard To Be In Love With You" (co-lead vocal) from Voices
 "You've Lost That Lovin' Feelin'" (co-lead vocal) from Voices
 "Africa" from Voices
 "Mano A Mano" from Private Eyes
 "Friday Let Me Down" from Private Eyes
 "Italian Girls" from H2O
 "At Tension" from H2O
 "Jingle Bell Rock" from 1983 Christmas single (flip-side featured another version with lead vocals by Daryl Hall)
 "Possession Obsession" from Big Bam Boom
 "Cold Dark And Yesterday" from Big Bam Boom
 "Rockability" (co-lead vocal) from Ooh Yeah!
 "Keep on Pushin' Love" from Ooh Yeah!
 "Change of Season" (co-lead vocal) from Change of Season
 "Only Love" from Change of Season
 "Starting All Over Again"(co-lead vocal) from Change of Season
 "Time Won't Pass Me By" (co-lead vocal) from Marigold Sky
 "War of Words" from Marigold Sky
 "Someday We'll Know" (co-lead vocal) from Do It for Love
 "Love in a Dangerous Time" from Do It for Love
 "Ooh Child" from Our Kind of Soul
 "Whatcha See Is Whatcha Get" from Our Kind of Soul
 "No Child Should Ever Cry on Christmas" from Home for Christmas
 "The Christmas Song" from Home for Christmas
 "Don't Go Out" from Do What You Want, Be What You Are box set
 "All the Way from Philadelphia" (co-lead vocal) from Do What You Want, Be What You Are box set
 "I Want Someone" (co-lead vocal) from Do What You Want, Be What You Are box set

Discography

Studio albums 
 Phunk Shui (2002)
 1000 Miles of Life (2008)
 Mississippi Mile (2011)
 Good Road to Follow (2014)
 Arkansas (2018)

Live albums 
 Live at the Historic Wheeler Opera House (2004)
 John Oates Solo – The Album, The Concert (2006)
 The Bluesville Sessions (2012)
 Another Good Road (2015)
 Live in Nashville (2020)

References

External links

Official John Oates website
Official website of Hall & Oates

1948 births
American people of English descent
American people of Gibraltarian descent
American people of Italian descent
American male singers
American rock guitarists
American male guitarists
American soul musicians
Singers from New York City
People from Montgomery County, Pennsylvania
Temple University alumni
Living people
Singers from Pennsylvania
Hall & Oates members
American rhythm and blues singers
IMSA GT Championship drivers
Guitarists from Philadelphia
Guitarists from New York City
20th-century American guitarists
20th-century American male musicians
Thirty Tigers artists